Televisione Cristiana in Italia (TCI), also known as TBNE (Trinity Broadcasting Network Europe), is a free-to-air Italian religious TV channel headquartered in Marnate, Italy. It was founded by Chuck Hall and his late wife Nora in 1979. It is available throughout Europe via Hot Bird 6, and in Italy (Piedmont, Lombardy and Lazio) via DVB-T. Besides locally produced Italian televangelistic programmes, the channel broadcasts Christian rock music videos and dubbed or subtitled programmes produced by the Trinity Broadcasting Network in the United States.

Programming
Per lodare Te
Questo è il tuo giorno (This is Your Day)
TBNEWS
Dietro le quinte
Controcorrente

Personalities
Benny Hinn
Chuck Hall
Nora Hall (died 2007)

External links
TBNE on YouTube
History of TBNE 

Trinity Broadcasting Network
Evangelical television networks
Television channels and stations established in 1979
Television channels in Italy
Italian-language television stations